The Lahore Metrobus is a bus rapid transit service operating in Lahore Punjab, Pakistan. Lahore Metrobus service is integrated with Lahore Transport Company's local bus service to operate as one urban transport system, providing seamless transit service across Lahore District with connections to neighboring suburban communities. The Lahore Metrobus was designed to be opened in stages, with the first stage opening on 11 February 2013 stretching from Gajumata to Shahadra. The 27 km stretch was opened during a ceremony by Punjab Chief Minister Shahbaz Sharif along with Deputy Prime Minister of Turkey Bekir Bozdağ. The second and third stages have been put on hold, as proposals have been put forth to convert the remaining stages to light rail.

History 

Lahore Transport Company was established in 1984 to ease the traffic conditions of Lahore and improve bus services. LTC got all the transport responsibilities of traveling in Lahore in December 2009. A BRTS fleet of 650 Buses was introduced. It was given name "Lahore Bus Company". However, the BRTS did not have dedicated lanes and had to share roads with regular traffic with no right of way privileges. This resulted in a system that was a BRTS only in name.

Planning
After 20 years of discussion, the ambitious Lahore Metro, which had first been proposed in 1991 was abandoned in favour of a bus transit system.

Construction
Construction of the project was divided into different packages and was awarded to different contractors. Given to Haji Muhammad Aslam (HMA) and Sons Cranage (Pvt.) Ltd, for all major heavy steel and pillar work, this also included digging into the ground to develop the foundations of the project, and M/s Zahir Khan & Brothers in joint venture with M/s Reliable Engineering Services (Pvt.) Limited constructed the flyover part including two elevated rotaries for BRTS. Construction project started in March 2012 and buses entered service in February 2013. The system, which was constructed by the Traffic Engineering and Planning Agency (TEPA), a subsidiary of the Lahore Development Authority (LDA) at a cost Rs 29.65 billion. The system was built on the build–operate–transfer basis via the collaboration between the Punjab and the Turkish government.

The system was inaugurated by Punjab, Chief Minister, Mian Shahbaz Sharif on February 11, 2013, in a ceremony attended by Turkish Deputy Prime Minister Bekir Bozdağ, Prime Minister and PML-N ex-chief Nawaz Sharif, as well as ambassadors from a number of other countries. The Mayor of Istanbul, Kadir Topbaş, also announced a gift of 100 buses. It is Pakistan's first bus rapid transit system.

Operation
Lahore MBS currently operates a fleet of 66 buses which were deployed by Albayrak Platform Turizm after a seven-year contract in 2013. The buses run on a single 28.7 km long Ferozepur Road corridor with two other corridors being planned. Buses on the current route have an average speed of 26 km/h. The system uses e-ticketing and Intelligent Transportation System wand. System operations are managed by the Punjab Metrobus Authority (PMBA), though IT services are handled in coordination with Punjab IT Board.

Following the initiation ceremony, use of the system was to be free during the first month. However, following a week of chaos and overcrowding, a fare of Rs. 20 (US$0.2) was imposed irrespective of the destination.

According to the Lahore Transport Company, the daily ridership of the Metrobus exceeds 180,000 with the peak hourly ridership being 10,000 passengers per hour per direction (p/h/d). Studies conducted by the transport company claim that this figure will increase by 222% to 20,000 p/h/d in 2021. To keep the cost affordable for everyone Punjab Government has to pay Rs 40 as subsidy on each Re 20 ticket.

Design 
The Lahore Metrobus meets the criteria laid out by the Institute for Transportation and Development Policy. It has barrier-controlled, automated off-board fare collection, a service interval of less than 2 minutes during peak hours, stations with well-designed signage and information systems and a precision bus docking system (See: Guided Bus). The terminal approach system has escalators and underground, subway-styled approach tubes. Due to these approach tubes, prospective passengers don't have to cross high-speed roads to get to the stations, but go below them instead, an example of a segregated Right-of-way.  The stations have parking spaces for motorbikes and cycles while the two terminals provide car-parking facilities as well.

Ticketing 
Two types of ticketing systems exist at the Metrobus terminals:
 Single-ride tokens that are good for one journey only and can be purchased for Rs. 30 (US$0.17) at the on-site ticket booth or the self-service Ticket Vending Machines .
 Metrobus Cards that can be utilized for multiple journeys. These RFID-based cards are credit-card sized and are previously available at the Metro Bus ticket offices for a refundable amount of Rs. 130 (US$ 0.73) but are free of cost since December 2017 on showing your national identity card or Form-B in case you are younger than 18. These cards can be recharged to a maximum balance of Rs. 1000 (US$ 5.65) at the TVMs. The Metrobus cards remove the hassle of standing in a queue for a token and card-holders can proceed directly to the terminal. Same card can also be used on the feeder routes of Metro Bus.

Expansion
The Punjab Government in April 2015 approved the expansion of Lahore Metrobus. 15 km track will added on current route. On Northern end it will be expanded 10 km from Shahdara to Kala Shah Kaku and on Southern end it will be expanded 5 km from Gajjumata to Kahna.

Incidents

Overheating vehicles, May 2013
During late May 2013, the Metrobuses started to develop an over-heating problem as the temperatures in the city crossed 45°C. The air-conditioners gave way and the engines started blowing fumes. Passengers had to bear sweltering heat in the congested buses as well as constant stoppages. Punjab Metrobus Authority's public relations officer, Amir Masood, told the media that when the buses were imported the manufacturers, Sweden-based Volvo and China-based Sunwin, were told to provide buses that could remain operational in temperatures approaching 51 °C. When the operation error came to surface, Masood said that the suppliers are being fined and the further import of buses from them is halted. To counter the problem, new air-conditioning units were fitted in the buses in late June 2013.

Related Projects
The Punjab Government, in the development program of 2013-14, proposed similar Metrobus projects for Rawalpindi, Faisalabad and Multan. Metrobus in Islamabad and Rawalpindi was inaugurated on 4 June 2015 by the Prime Minister.
Multan Metrobus was inaugurated on 24 January 2017 by PM Nawaz Sharif. 
Karachi Metrobus is now operational and Faisalabad Metrobus is planned.

See also 
 Orange Line Metro Train, Lahore
 Transport in Lahore
 List of bus routes in Lahore
 Rawalpindi-Islamabad Metrobus
 TransMilenio 
 Transjakarta
 Multan Metrobus
 Peshawar Metrobus
 Karachi Metrobus
 Metro App

References

External links 
 Punjab Metrobus Authority
The Metrobus Route
 Tribune (Newspaper)
 The Nation (Pakistani Newspaper) 
 Guide of Lahore
 The News (Newspaper)
 DAWN (Pakistani News Paper)
 

Bus rapid transit
Transport in Lahore
Bus rapid transit in Pakistan